Jolene Jacobs (born 24 March 1992) is a Namibian athlete. She competed in the women's 60 metres at the 2018 IAAF World Indoor Championships. In 2019, she represented Namibia at the 2019 African Games held in Rabat, Morocco. She competed in the women's 100 metres.

References

External links
 

1992 births
Living people
Namibian female sprinters
Place of birth missing (living people)
Athletes (track and field) at the 2019 African Games
African Games competitors for Namibia
20th-century Namibian women
21st-century Namibian women